The Indices of Deprivation 2010 (ID 2010) is a deprivation index at the small area level, created by the British Department for Communities and Local Government (DCLG) and released on 24 March 2011. It follows the ID2007 and because much of the datasets are the same or similar between indices allows a comparison of "relative deprivation" of an area between the two indices.

While it is known as the ID2010, most of the data actually dates from 2008.

Key results

Over 5 million people lived in the most deprived areas in England in 2008 and 38 per cent of them were income deprived.
Liverpool, Middlesbrough, Manchester, Knowsley, the City of Kingston upon Hull, Hackney and Tower Hamlets are the local authorities with the highest proportion of lower layer Super Output Areas (LSOAs) amongst the most deprived in England.
98% of the most deprived LSOAs are in urban areas but there are also pockets of deprivation across rural areas
56% of local authorities contain at least one LSOA amongst the 10 per cent most deprived in England
88% of the LSOAs that are the most deprived in 2010 were also amongst the most deprived in 2007.

According to the research, the most deprived area in the country is in the village of Jaywick on the Essex coast.

References

Department for Levelling Up, Housing and Communities
Geography of England
Measurements and definitions of poverty
Medical data sets
Office for National Statistics
Poverty in England
Public health in the United Kingdom
Social statistics data